John Lloyd Miller  is an American filmmaker who has directed, produced and/or written music videos, short films, features, documentaries, commercials and television programming.

Career

Miller has worked in virtually every aspect of the film and television business as a director, writer and producer.  He began his career while attending the graduate film production program at the University of Southern California.  Miller attended USC Film School with such notables as Jay Roach, Greg Beeman and Ken Kwapis.  Miller won a Golden Reel award along with Jacqueline Woolf for their work on "The Big Garage" directed by Greg Beeman Miller began working with early music video director Jack Cole as a writer and eventually as a co-director for such artists as, Bon Jovi, Steve Perry, Amy Grant, Sawyer Brown and Dionne Warwick.

Miller has directed over 250 music videos, including Garth Brooks', "The Dance", The Smithereens, "A Girl Like You", Eazy-E and N.W.A, "Easier Said than Dunn", Reba McEntire, "What If", Dolly Parton, "Just When I Needed You Most", The Goo Goo Dolls, "There You Are", The Fat Boys and Chubby Checker, "The Twist", Billy Ray Cyrus, "I Give My Heart to You" and Joe Cocker, "You Are So Beautiful".

Miller grew up in Westfield, New Jersey and upon graduation from Westfield High School, he enlisted in the United States Navy.

After the Navy Miller attended Northeastern University in Boston where Miller got his first taste of production by working as an editor and director for the school's television station.  Miller graduated with honors and left for California to attend the MFA program at the University of Southern California.

Miller's work in music video has won countless awards, including video of the year awards for Billboard Magazine, MusicRow, ACM Awards, CMA Awards, Cine Golden Eagle and CCMA.   Several of John Lloyd Miller's videos appear in CMT's Greatest Videos of All Time, including Vince Gill, "One More Last Chance", Vince Gill, "Go Rest High on That Mountain", KT Oslin, "'80s Ladies", George Strait, "Check Yes or No", Travis Tritt, "More Than You'll Ever Know", and Garth Brooks', "The Dance", which is listed as in the top five all time.  A six time CMA Award nominee, John Lloyd Miller is one of the top ten country music video directors of all time.

In 1999 Miller collaborated with country music star Mark Collie to create what eventually became the critically acclaimed, award-winning film, "I Still Miss Someone."  It was the first film portrayal of Johnny Cash.  The film won awards around the world and was the only short film selected to be shown in the "30 Greatest Films of the Last 30 Years," alongside such films as "Blue Velvet", "Easy Rider", "Pulp Fiction" at the Woodstock Festival.

Miller's has directed TV shows for HBO, VH1 and many more.  As a screenwriter, Miller was contracted to write a series of three feature scripts for Dove Canyon Films.  They include, "Saucer" an adaptation of New York Times Bestseller Stephen Coonts novel of the same name, "Butterfly Kisses" and "St. X Prep".  He is a member of WGAe.

Miller is referenced in The Garth Factor: The Career Behind The Country's Big Boom , The Encyclopedia of Country Music,Country Music Trivia & Fact Book  and The Garth Brooks Scrapbook, and was a contributing writer to The Real Meaning of Life.

Miller is the founder of The AV Squad , his production company in Tennessee and a co-creator of Beacon Bay Creative with offices in Los Angeles, Hilton Head and Nashville.

Miller is the father of twins, Jack and Ella, and resides primarily in Brentwood, Tennessee.

Awards

Film and television

Music videos

Select music video filmography
 Eazy-E, "Eazy-er Said Than Dunn"
 The Fat Boys featuring Chubby Checker, "The Twist"
 Garth Brooks, "The Dance"
 Garth Brooks, "If Tomorrow Never Comes"
 Kevin Skinner, "The Last Goodbye"
 Reba McEntire, "What If"
 Goo Goo Dolls, "There You Are"
 The Smithereens, "A Girl Like You"
 The Smithereens, "Top of the Pops"
 The Smithereens, "Blues Before and After"
 The Smithereens and Belinda Carlisle, "Blue Period"
 Joe Cocker, "What Are You Doing with a Fool Like Me"
 Joe Cocker, "You Are So Beautiful" (unplugged)
 Joe Cocker, "Unchain My Heart" (co-director)
 Vince Gill, "Go Rest High on That Mountain"
 Vince Gill, "I Still Believe in You"
 Vince Gill, "A Little More Love"
 Vince Gill, "When Love Finds You"
 Vince Gill, "Tryin' to Get Over You"
 Vince Gill, "Never Knew Lonely"
 Vince Gill, "Don't Let Our Love Start Slippin' Away"
 Vince Gill, "Pocket Full of Gold"
 Vince Gill, "What the Cowgirls Do"
 Vince Gill, "Look at Us"
 Vince Gill, "Liza Jane"
 Vince Gill, "One More Last Chance"
 Vince Gill, "Have Yourself a Merry Little Christmas"
 Eazy-E & N.W.A, "Eazy-er Said Than Dunn"
 Bryan White, Linda Davis, John Berry, Jimmy Fortune, Mila Mason, Kevin Sharp, Mark Collie & Wayne Warner, "God Bless The Children"
 Travis Tritt, "More Than You'll Ever Know"
 Travis Tritt and Marty Stuart, "This One's Gonna Hurt You"
 Bob Carlisle, "Butterfly Kisses"
 Bob Carlisle, "A Father's Love"
 Ricky Skaggs, "Solid Ground"
 Billy Ray Cyrus, "Give My Heart To You"
 Billy Ray Cyrus and Bobby Cyrus, "The Milkman's Eyes"
 Dolly Parton and Alison Krauss, "Just When I Needed You Most"
 George Jones, "Wild Irish Rose"
 George Strait, "Check Yes or No"
 George Strait, "Baby's Gotten Good at Goodbye"
 Patsy Cline, "Crazy"
 Identical Strangers, "Julianna Wilson",
 Cledus T. Judd, "Wives Do It All The Time"
 Cledus T. Judd, "Every Light in the House Is Blown"
 Cledus T. Judd with Buck Owens, "First Redneck on the Internet"
 Phil Perry, "Call Me"
 Melba Moore and Freddie Jackson, "I Can't Complain"
 The Mavericks, "Hey Good Lookin'"
 The Fat Boys and Chubby Checker, "The Twist"
 The Kentucky Headhunters, "Walk Softly on This Heart of Mine"
 The Kentucky Headhunters, "Dumas Walker"
 The Kentucky Headhunters, "Oh Lonesome Me"
 The Kentucky Headhunters, "The Ballad of Davy Crockett"
 The Kentucky Headhunters, "Honky Tonk Walkin'"
 The Kentucky Headhunters, "Dixie Fried"
 The Kentucky Headhunters, "Singin' the Blues"
 Kool & the Gang, "Strong"
 NewSong, "Rhythm of the World"
 Patty Loveless, "I'm That Kind of Girl"
 Patty Loveless, "Hurt Me Bad"
 Patty Loveless, "I Try to Think About Elvis"
 Patty Loveless, "The Night's Too Long"
 Patty Loveless, "Chains"
 Patty Loveless, "Jealous Bone"
 John Berry, "Your Love Amazes Me"
 John Berry, "Standing on the Edge of Goodbye"
 Lee Roy Parnell, "Love Without Mercy"
 Bobbie Cryner, "I Just Can't Stand To Be Unhappy"
 Bobbie Cryner, "You'd Think He'd Know Me Better"
 Bobbie Cryner, "I Didn't Know My Own Strength"
 Major Rising, "Dare The World"
 T. Graham Brown, "Come as You Were"
 Marty Stuart, "Tempted"
 Marty Stuart, "Now That's Country"
 Marty Stuart, "Thanks to You"
 Marty Stuart, "Red Red Wine"
 Marty Stuart, "Kiss Me, I'm Gone"
 Marty Stuart, "That's What Love's About"
 Marty Stuart, "Love and Luck"
 Marty Stuart, "Hey Baby"
 Tanya Tucker, "Strong Enough to Bend" (co-director)
 Dionne Warwick and Kashif, "Reservations for Two"
 Kashif and Meli'sa Morgan, "Love Changes"
 Rhonda Gunn, "Some Somebody"
 Hank Williams, Jr., "Come on Over to the Country"
 Tourniquet, "Crawl to China"
 Aaron Tippin, "There Ain't Nothin' Wrong with the Radio"
 James Bonamy, "Dog on a Tool Box"
 Joy Lynn White, "Bad Loser"
 Joy Lynn White, "Little Tears"
 Joy Lynn White, "True Confessions"
 Hank Flamingo, "Baby It's You"
 Skip Ewing, "If A Man Could Live on Love Alone"
 Neal McCoy, "They're Playin' Our Song"
 Neal McCoy, "If I Was a Drinkin' Man"
 Mark Collie, "Something With a Ring to It"
 Mark Collie, "Looks Aren't Everything"
 Mark Collie, "Hardin County Line"
 Mark Collie, "She's Never Comin' Back"
 Mark Collie, "Let Her Go"
 Mark Collie, "Born to Love You"
 Mark Collie, "Even the Man in the Moon Is Cryin'"
 Mark Collie, "Three Words"
 Mark Collie, "It Is No Secret"
 Mark Collie, "Hard Lovin' Woman"
 Bryan White, "Someone Else's Star"
 Mark Chesnutt, "Ol' Country"
 Mark Chesnutt, "I'll Think of Something"
 Mark Chesnutt, "Almost Goodbye"
 Mark Chesnutt, "It Sure Is Monday"
 Mac McAnally, "Down the Road"
 Mac McAnally, "Not That Long Ago"
 Diamond Rio, "In a Week or Two"
 Lionel Cartwright, "Say It's Not True"
 Lionel Cartwright, "Leap of Faith"
 Lionel Cartwright, "I Watched It All"
 Butch Baker, "Our Little Corner"
 K. T. Oslin, "80's Ladies" (co-director)
 K. T. Oslin, "I'll Always Come Back" (co-director)
 Ronnie Milsap, "A Woman in Love"
 Restless Heart, "Dancy's Dream"
 Deborah Allen, "Break These Chains"
 Sawyer Brown, "The Race Is On"
 Sawyer Brown, "Somewhere in the Night" (co-director)
 Marty Brown, "Every Now and Then"
 Marty Brown, "High & Dry"
 Marty Brown, "You Must Be Mistaken Me"
 Marty Brown, "Can't Wrap Your Arms Around A Memory"
 Marty Brown, "It Must Be the Rain"
 Marty Brown, "Cryin', Lovin', Leavin'"
 PT Gazell, "When I Fall in Love"
 The Cox Family, "Runaway"
 Bobby Cyrus and Billy Ray Cyrus, "Milkman's Eyes"

Select commercials, TV, & film
 "I Still Miss Someone", film, written by John Lloyd Miller & Mark Collie, directed by John Lloyd Miller
 "The Mobile Limits", film, Ortiva Wireless, produced & directed by John Lloyd Miller
 "Saucer", screenplay adaptation of Stephen Coonts' novel, Dove Canyon Films
 "Saint X Prep", screenplay by John Lloyd Miller, Dove Canyon Films
 "Butterfly Kisses", screenplay by John Lloyd Miller, Dove Canyon Films
 "Pigeon Forge Department of Tourism", tour videos, 1996–present
 "Pigeon Forge Department of Tourism", travel videos, 1996–present
 "Pigeon Forge Department of Tourism", city videos, 1996–present
 "Every Child Needs Love", Dave Thomas Foundation for Adoption, National Spots
 "Every Child Needs Love", Dave Thomas Foundation for Adoption, Canada
 "Wild Irish Rose", National Veterans Association, National Spots
 "Bye Bye Love", Gaylord Entertainment Company, National Spots
 "Premier Estates", Governor's Club and Resort, Regional Spots
 "Crack Baby", The United Way, Regional Spots
 "Butterfly Kisses", BMG Music, Home Video, Long Form TV, Spots, Music Video,
 "Marty Stuart Christmas", MCA Records, National Spot
 "Maggie", The United Way, Regional Spot
 "Newborn", Baptist Hospital, Regional Spot
 "Roxanne", The United Way, Regional Spot
 "Dare The World", B-Venturous Records, National Spot
 "Vince Gill, The Videos", MCA Records, DVD compilation
 "Patty Loveless: Greatest Hits", MCA Records. DVD compilation
 "Live Opening Night", The Alabama Grill, multi-camera live satellite broadcast
 "Desert Star", US Military, Salute to the troops of Desert Storm
 "Butterfly Kisses", BMG/Provident Music, TV special
 "Pickin' on Nashville", VH1, TV special
 "Influences, Featuring Randy Travis and George Jones", HBO, special
 "Magic Johnson Foundation" Awards, live event featuring Muhammad Ali, Will Smith, Eddie Murphy, et al.
 "The Big Bad Music Special", BET, live concert – Ludacris, Chaka Khan, Boyz II Men
 "Magic Comedy Slam, hosted by Steve Harvey, BET – comedy special
 "Magic Johnson All Star Basketball", live event and live sports at the Staples Center
 "DVD on TV", FX Networks, four episodes "Batman Begins", "Walk the Line", "Mr. & Mrs. Smith", "Fantastic Four"
 "Alive at Brushy Mountain", Wilbanks Entertainment, documentary

External links
  The AV Squad – Official Website 
 Beacon Bay Creative – Official Website

References

American music video directors
Film producers from New Jersey
American male screenwriters
Living people
Artists from Elizabeth, New Jersey
Northeastern University alumni
USC School of Cinematic Arts alumni
Writers from Elizabeth, New Jersey
People from Westfield, New Jersey
Westfield High School (New Jersey) alumni
Film directors from New Jersey
Screenwriters from New Jersey
Year of birth missing (living people)